Missing is a 1918 American silent drama film directed by James Young and written by Mary Augusta Ward, J. Stuart Blackton, and James Young. The film stars Thomas Meighan, Sylvia Breamer, Robert Gordon, Winter Hall, Ola Humphrey and Mollie McConnell. The film was released on June 16, 1918, by Paramount Pictures.

Plot
Nell (Beamer) and Lt. George Surratt (Gordon) are happily married, but Nell's sister Hester (Humphrey) is disappointed because she had hoped to obtain social standing and wealth through the marriage by Nell to an old but wealthy man. Shortly after the marriage, George joins the fighting men in France, but is later reported missing. Sir William Farrell, who cannot go to war because of lameness, becomes interested in Nell, and Hester, forcing Nell to believe her husband is dead, urges her to accept Sir William's proposal. Although Hester tries to intercept it, Nell receives a message that George is alive but suffering from shell shock. The singing of his favorite song, "Bonnie Sweet Bessie", by his wife completely restores his memory and they are happily reunited.

Cast
Thomas Meighan as Sir William Farrell
Sylvia Breamer as Nell Surratt
Robert Gordon as Lt. George Surratt
Winter Hall as Dr. Howson
Ola Humphrey as Hester
Mollie McConnell as Mrs. Greyson
Kathleen O'Connor as Cicely

References

External links

Film stills at silenthollywood.com

1918 films
1910s English-language films
Silent American drama films
1918 drama films
Paramount Pictures films
Films directed by James Young
American black-and-white films
American silent feature films
Films based on British novels
1910s American films